Ernst Paulus (3 January 1897, in Marburg – 12 September 1986, in Reinickendorf) was a German athlete who competed in the 1928 Summer Olympics.

References

1897 births
1986 deaths
German male discus throwers
Olympic athletes of Germany
Athletes (track and field) at the 1928 Summer Olympics
Sportspeople from Marburg